Winters High School in Winters, California had its first graduating class in 1895.

The school is located at 101 Grant Avenue in Winters, California.

The school mascot is "The Warrior."

Courses/Clubs
Physical Education-Daniel Ward 

Student Body Government and Yearbook-Courtney Casavecchia 

National FFA Organization  - Kayla Roberts & Donnie Whitworth 

Rotary Interact  - Olivia Rodriguez

Friday Night Live  - Olivia Rodriguez

American Field Service - Marcella Heredia

Friends Without Borders  - Olivia Rodriguez

Band - Rebecca Ciardelli 

Art - Kate Humphrey 

ROP Culinary/ Food Science - Christopher Novello

Engineering - Raena Lavelle

AP Spanish/Foreign Language (Spanish) - Guadalupe Clanton & Polita Gonzales

AP Biology/AP Physics - Constance Coman & Evan Barnes

AP Literature/AP Composition and Literature - Kari Mann & Matt Biers-Ariel

AP Calculus- Mike Challender

English 9,10,11,12 - Kari Mann, and Matt Ariel Biers

Integrated Math I, II, and III, Business Math, Math Applications- Matt Baker and Mike Challender

Earth Science, Biology, Chemistry, Agricultural Biology- Evan Barnes, Danielle Bertrand, and Kayla Roberts

World History, US History, Government and Economics- Courtney Caruso, James Stark, and Jessica Williams

Psychology- James Stark

Other:
Teacher Assistant, Library Intern, Cross Age Tutor, Office Assistant

Notable alumni
Rich Chiles, former Major League Baseball player (1971–78)

References

External links
 Official school web site

High schools in Yolo County, California
Winters, California
Public high schools in California
W. H. Weeks buildings
1891 establishments in California